6 is the sixth album from the Hungarian musical ensemble After Crying, released in 1997.

Track listing

Personnel

Gábor Egervári - vocals and flute
Görgényi Tamás - vocals
Péter  Pejtsik - cello, bass, synthesizer, vocals and programming
Ferenc Torma - electric and acoustic guitar, bass and programming
Balázs  Winkler - trumpet, keyboards, percussion and programming

Additional musicians:

Ferenc Szabó - drums and percussion
Judit Andrejszky - vocals
Láslo Koós - basso profundo
Zoltán Lengyel - grand piano
Pál Makovecz - trombone
Mihály Borbély - soprano, tenor and alto saxophone
Csaba Klenján - baritone saxophone
Péter Erdey - horns
Mónika Szabó - flute
Ottó Rácz - oboe
György Reé - clarinet
Vilmos Horváth - bassoon

References 

1997 albums
After Crying albums